The Mercedes-Benz W105 is the internal designation for a four-door executive car, manufactured by Daimler-Benz from 1956 to 1959, and marketed as the Mercedes-Benz Typ(e) 219. The W105 was nicknamed Ponton, along with its Mercedes model siblings, from its introduction, because it employed Ponton, or pontoon styling, a defining post-war car design innovation that unified a car's previously articulated bonnet, wings, body and running boards into a singular, slab-sided envelope.

The Mercedes 219 (internally W105), had a 2.2 L inline 6-cylinder engine, and uniquely featured a bodyshell that combined the stretched nose of the more luxury W128 and W180 models 220a and 220 S(E), but shared the regular standard wheelbase cabine, with shorter rear doors, with the 1953 entry-level 4-cylinder  Mercedes W120/W121 models 180 and 190, to offer an intermediate no-frills 6-cylinder model option.

History
The body shape had been introduced in 1953 by the W120 chassis 180. In the following year, Mercedes-Benz introduced the 6-cylinder 220a which was visually similar to the 180, but with a  longer wheelbase, and an entirely new rear suspension design.  were added to the front to accommodate the two extra cylinders and  added to the rear doors to provide more legroom for the rear passengers. This model ran until 1956 when the 219 and the 220S were introduced.

Model identification
The 219 from the a-pillar forward was identical to the long-nosed 220a, including the single-carburettor 2.2 L 6-cylinder engine. However, from the apillar back, it used the shorter body of the W120/W121 180/190 models — accordingly, wheelbase and total length of the 219 were shorter compared to the 220 S, but bigger compared to the 190. This can be identified by the one-piece windows in the rear doors, as opposed to the 220a and 220S having separate quarter windows.

Inside, the 219 used the simpler instrumentation of the small car, along with bakelite trim instead of woodgrain.

References

W105
W105
Executive cars
Cars introduced in 1956
Limousines

de:Mercedes-Benz W180